Ateneu Deportiu Guíxols is a football club from the town of Sant Feliu de Guíxols, in Catalonia, Spain.

Season to season

11 seasons in Tercera División

Honours
 1 Campionat de Catalunya de Segona Categoria: 1922
 1 Trofeu Moscardó: 1964
 1 Campionat de Primera Regional: 1985

External links
fcf.cat profile
Unofficial website

Football clubs in Catalonia
Association football clubs established in 1914
Divisiones Regionales de Fútbol clubs
1914 establishments in Spain